Justice Church may refer to:

Samuel Church, chief justice of the Connecticut Supreme Court
Sanford E. Church, chief judge of the New York Court of Appeals
William E. Church, associate justice of the South Dakota Supreme Court